Marijan Seđak (born 24 March 1952 in Bjelovar) is a former Croatian handball player and handball coach.

Career
Marijan Seđak grew up in Rijeka and started his handball career in Partizan Zamet. After winning the regional league in his first season he was invited by Vlado Stenzel to join RK Kvarner in the Yugoslav First League.

Wanting to concentrate more on his studies at the time Seđak returned to Partizan Zamet who were then still in the third tier. He played for the club until 1978. In that time the club moved from the third to the first tier. Seđak retired from playing handball but stayed on as assistant coach for one more season.

His first head coaching job was with RK Turnić then called RK Aleksandar Mamić. He then coached RK Kvarner for two seasons. In 1982 he began coaching ŽRK Zamet. In 1987 Seđak coached RK Zamet and led them to the Yugoslav First League.

In 1988 he moved to Norway where he has coached Spjelkavik, Bergsøy IL, Sola HK, Lunner IL. 
His son Dalibor is also a coach.

Honours

Player
Zamet
Yugoslav Second League (1): 1977-78
Yugoslav Third League (1): 1976-77
Regional League of Primorje and Istra (1): 1969-70

Coach
Zamet
Yugoslav Second League (1): 1986–87

Spjelkavik
2. Division (1): 1990-1991
3. Division (1): 1989-1990

Sola
1. Division (2): 1995-1996, 1997–98
2. Division (1): 1994-1995
3. Division (1): 1993-1994

Fjellhammer IL
1. Division (1): 2005-2006

Raumnes & Årnes Idrettslag
4. Division (1): 2011-12

Individual
Award for success full coaching in Rijeka - 1979
Best head coach of 1984, 1987 by: Handball Federation of Rijeka

References

Croatian male handball players
RK Zamet players
RK Zamet coaches
ŽRK Zamet coaches
Sportspeople from Bjelovar
Handball players from Rijeka
RK Kvarner players
RK Kvarner coaches
Croatian expatriate sportspeople in Norway
Yugoslav emigrants to Norway
1952 births
Living people